Horseshoe Canyon is a region of badlands surrounded by prairie in the province of Alberta, Canada.

The canyon gets its name from its horseshoe shape, defined by two coulees that flow into the Kneehill Creek, a tributary of the Red Deer River. The canyon's two arms are approximately 5 km long each, extending from Highway 9 to Kneehill Creek, at two former mining communities of Dunphy and Gatine. In turn, it gives the name to the Horseshoe Canyon Formation.

In 2020, a boy named Nathan Hrushkin discovered a dinosaur fossil at the canyon dating back to 69 million years.

See also
Geography of Alberta

References

External links

Landforms of Alberta
Canyons and gorges of Canada
Kneehill County